Caulerpa trifaria is a species of seaweed in the Caulerpaceae family.

In Western Australia, it is found along the coast around Perth extending south to around Esperance. It is also found in Victoria and Tasmania.

References

trifaria
Species described in 1863